Kim Staelens (born 7 January 1982 in Kortrijk, Belgium) is a Dutch professional volleyball player last under contract at Romanian team Ştiinţa Bacău. Her older sister Chaïne is also a Dutch international volleyball player. Their father Jean-Pierre played many international matches for the Belgium national volleyball team. Staelens speaks Dutch, English, French and German. Kim Staelens plays as a setter and is able to spike at 305 cm, while she is capable of blocking at 301 cm.

International team career
Born in Belgium both Staelens sisters were known to be talented players and decided to acquire for Dutch citizenship because they did not see enough future in the Belgian team. As their mother is Dutch both were welcomed in The Netherlands and became national team regulars shortly after. So far she has played 154 international matches for the Dutch team. Staelens was part of the Dutch squad for the 2006 World Championship where the placed 8th. She was also part of the team during the 2007 Boris Yeltsin Cup in Yekaterinburg where the Dutch won the silver medal after losing the final to China (3–1).

Club team career
 Hermanas Wervik
 VC Wevelgem
 Bonduelle WC
 VC Weert
 Marcq en Baroeul
 USSPA Albi
 USC Munster
 HCC/net Martinus Amstelveen
 Impel Gwardia Wrocław
 CS Ştiinţa Bacău

At the age of 15 Staelens decided to join her sister and play abroad in the Netherlands. Before that she played mainly in the reserve teams in the Belgian First division. As being only 15 years old she was having a hard time keeping up with her teammates during her first season in The Netherlands at Bonduelle WC. She moved to VC weert and during her second season at the club in 1999 she captured her first two prizes, winning both the Dutch league and the cup.

In 2000, she moved to France to play for Marcq en Baroeul, where she struggled to find her place in the team. She however decided to stay in France, but moved to another team. Also at USSPA Albi she was unable to become a key player and to get used to the French lifestyle. She then found her way to Germany where she signed a contract with USC Munster.

In Munster things went better for herself which also resulted in better results. During her first season she did not capture any prizes but Munster finished in both the German league and cup in second position. One year later they showed their potential and were able to win both competitions. Staelens was at that time still part of the Munster team, however she did miss the crucial part of the season due to a knee injury.

This knee injury prevented her from playing volleyball during the 2004 and 2005 seasons and she was recovering from her injury in a sports clinic in Zeist. For a long time it was unsure whether she was able to return to her top level. As soon as she was able to play in the later part of 2005 she was however immediately being called up for the national squad and participated in several tournaments. Like most of her fellow national squad members and coach Avital Selinger she decided to sign a contract with HCC/net Martinus Amstelveen to be part of a unique project on their way to the 2008 Summer Olympics. It was not much of a surprise that Martinus captured both the Dutch league title as they Dutch cup in that year.

In 2012, she returned to the national team after a break.

Prizes
Dutch National Championship title: 1999 (VC Weert), 2006 (Martinus)
Dutch National Cup title: 1999 (VC Weert), 2006 (Martinus)
German National Championship title: 2003 (USC Munster)
German National Cup title: 2003 (USC Munster)
Romanian National Championship title: 2013, 2014 (CS Ştiinţa Bacău)

Awards
best setter at the 1999 European Youth Championship in Poland
best setter at the 1999 Youth Eight Nations Tournament in France
runner-up setter at the 2003 European Championship in Turkey
fourth best blocker at the 2003 World Grand Prix
fourth best server at the 2003 World Grand Prix
fourth best setter at the 2003 World Grand Prix

References

External links
Official site
Kim Staelens intro movie
FIVB profile

1982 births
Living people
Dutch women's volleyball players
Belgian women's volleyball players
Expatriate volleyball players in France
Dutch expatriate sportspeople in Romania
Sportspeople from Kortrijk
Setters (volleyball)
Expatriate volleyball players in Germany
Expatriate volleyball players in Poland
Expatriate volleyball players in Romania
Dutch expatriate sportspeople in France
Dutch expatriate sportspeople in Poland
Belgian people of Dutch descent
Dutch people of Belgian descent